Paul Gallagher Scherrer (born December 16, 1968) is a realtor and former American stage, film and television actor. He began his career as a child actor on the stage. Scherrer retired from acting in 2001 and now lives and works in Indianapolis.

Early life and career
Scherrer was born in Rochester, New York to Gay and Paul Scherrer and raised in Indianapolis. He began acting as a child and played Peter Cratchit in a musical production of A Christmas Carol. At 13, he earned an Encore Award for best performance by a child actor for his role in the musical, Camelot.

Scherrer attended North Central High School for two years where he played varsity baseball and graduated in 1987. Upon graduation, he enrolled at Loyola University Chicago. He dropped out after his freshman year to play Eric, the 16-year-old aspiring actor and janitor on the 1988 sitcom, The Van Dyke Show. The series was canceled later that same year. In 1989, he was cast as Robb Harper on the ABC sitcom Free Spirit. The series struggled in the ratings and was canceled by ABC in January 1990. The following year, he was cast in yet another short-lived series, Sons and Daughters, starring Lucie Arnaz.

In 1992, Scherrer co-starred in the horror film Children of the Corn II: The Final Sacrifice. He returned to television with guest starring roles on Silk Stalkings, Quantum Leap, and Murder, She Wrote. In 1996, Scherrer had a supporting role in the NBC television movie Fall into Darkness starring Tatyana Ali and Jonathan Brandis. In 2000, he guest starred on Star Trek: Voyager in the seventh-season episode "Critical Care". His last acting role to date was in a 2001 episode of JAG.

Scherrer now owns United Real Estate, a real estate brokerage in Indianapolis, with his brother, Chris and is a member of Scherrer Bros, owned by his wife, Nicole and sister-in-law Valerie. Paul and Nicole have two children.

Filmography

Award nomination

References

External links
 

1968 births
20th-century American male actors
21st-century American male actors
American male child actors
American male film actors
American male musical theatre actors
American male television actors
American male stage actors
Living people
Loyola University Chicago alumni
Male actors from Indianapolis
American real estate brokers